Airville is a historic home located near Gloucester, Gloucester County, Virginia.  It consists of two sections. The earliest section dates to the last half of the 18th century, and has a central-passage plan and gambrel roof.  The second section is a three-story, frame addition dated to the late-1830s.  It features a Greek Revival style front porch with fluted-Ionic order columns. Also on the property are the contributing dairy, smokehouse, office, lumber house, and icehouse.

It was added to the National Register of Historic Places in 1990.

References

Houses on the National Register of Historic Places in Virginia
Federal architecture in Virginia
Greek Revival houses in Virginia
Houses in Gloucester County, Virginia
National Register of Historic Places in Gloucester County, Virginia